Ronnie McAda (born December 6, 1973) is a former American football quarterback for the United States Military Academy. He was drafted with the final pick of the 1997 NFL Draft by the Green Bay Packers, thus earning the distinction of being Mr. Irrelevant. In his senior season, he led Army past Navy and to the Independence Bowl.  He was the last player drafted in the National Football League from the U.S. Military Academy until Caleb Campbell was drafted in the 2008 NFL Draft by the Detroit Lions.

High school career
As a senior, McAda set a school record for passing yards. That year, he was named the offensive MVP of the district as a senior at Mesquite High School in Mesquite, Texas. In addition to district MVP, he was also named as his team's offensive MVP.

Collegiate career

1994
After spending 1993 on the Junior varsity team, McAda played all 11 games in the 1994 season, starting 8 at quarterback.

He began the season as the fourth player on the depth chart at that position. However, due to the injuries to starters Rick Roeper and Mike Makovec, he took over during a game against Temple and remained as starter for the remainder of the season.

1995
Started all 11 games at quarterback. McAda was second on the team in rushing yards with a career season highs 701 yards while passing for 761.

1996
Started 9 games at quarterback, missing two due to a deep bone bruise above his left ankle. Despite this, he still had an impressive statistical showing. McAda passed for a career high of 954 yards and set a team record for single season completion percentage at the time with 63.2%.

In a game against Navy, McAda rushed for a career best 134 yards in a 28-24 victory. McAda finished his career at Army with 2,333 passing yards and 1,703 rushing yards. This sums to 4,036 yards of total offense, good enough for sixth in school history.

Provided by CFB at Sports Reference: View Original Table
Generated June 4, 2018.

References

1973 births
Living people
People from Irving, Texas
American football quarterbacks
United States Military Academy alumni
Army Black Knights football players
Green Bay Packers players
Mesquite High School (Texas) alumni
Military personnel from Texas